Guru Granth Sahib, is the central religious text of Sikhism, considered by Sikhs to be the final sovereign Guru of the religion. It contains  1430 Angs (limbs), containing 5,894 hymns of 36 saint mystics which includes Sikh guru sahiban (6 gurus, possibly as many as 7 or 8), Bhagats (15 bhagats), Bhatts (11 bhatts) and gursikhs (4 gursikhs). It is notable among foundational religious scriptures for including hymns from writers of other religions, namely Hindus and Muslims. It also contains teachings of Sikh gurus themselves.

Categorization of authors
Scholars categorize the authors of the Guru Granth Sahib into four groups:
 Sikh Gurus
 Bhagats
 Bhatts
 Gursikhs

Sikh gurus

Philosophically, Sikhs are bound to believe in Shabad Guru — the words written in the Guru Granth Sāhib ji — but the general belief is that the Sikh Gurus established Sikhism over the centuries, beginning in the year 1469. The hymns of six Sikh Gurus are in the Guru Granth Sahib:

Whilst these six guru are widely accepted as having their writings included in the Guru Granth Sahib, there are some who argue compositions of Guru Har Rai and Guru Gobind Singh are also included. A Salok Mahalla Satvan (7) and Dohra Mahalla Dasvan (10) have been attributed by some to the seventh and tenth gurus, respectively.

Bhagats
In the below list, the Bhagats (from Sanskrit भक्त) were holy men of various sects whose teachings are included in the Sri Guru Granth Sahib ji. Their bani come under the title Bani Bhagtaan Ki. The word "Bhagat" means devotee, and comes from the Sanskrit word Bhakti, which means devotion and love. Bhagats evolved a belief in one God that preceded Kabir's selecting the writings of the great Hindu Bhaktis and Sufi saints.

The 15 Bhagat authors were:

Bhatts 
Many Hindu Saraswat Brahmins who started to follow the word of Guru Nanak Dev were known as Bhatts, meaning bards. The 11 Bhatt authors were:

Gursikhs
Bhai Sundar Ji, Bhai Mardana Ji, Bhai Satta Ji, Bhai Balwand Ji

Individuals and their contributions

Controversial authors

Mardana and Tall 
Two more writers of the present recension of Adi Granth are a matter of debate among scholars, namely Bhai Mardana and Bhatt Tall.

According to different scholars:
 Two hymns under the title Mardana 1 are said to be compositions of Bhai Mardana; however, others refute this claim, because the pen name Nanak is used inside the hymn, and because Mardana is a type of shalok.
 Similarly, there is a Swaiya under the name of Bhatt Tall, which according to some scholars is a Gurmukhi copyist's error for Kal i.e. Bhatt Kalshar.

Sri Chand 

According to a sakhi, when Guru Arjan had finished composing sixteen astpadis (cantos) of the Gauri Sukhmani composition, popularly known as Sukhmani Sahib, Sri Chand, the son of Guru Nanak, visited him. During this visit, it is said that Guru Arjan requested him to continue the composition he was compiling and complete the seventeenth canto of the Sukhmani Sahib. Sri Chand humbly recited the verse of his father following the Mul Mantar in the Japji Sahib. Thus, it became the seventeenth canto of the Sukhmani Sahib.

See also 

 Bhat Vahis

Notes

References

Guru Granth Sahib